The Tel Aviv derby refers to football matches between Israeli clubs Maccabi Tel Aviv and Hapoel Tel Aviv.

The rivalry between the clubs also exists in basketball, although Maccabi have been the dominant club in Israeli basketball since the 1960s.

History
Maccabi Tel Aviv was established in 1906, while Hapoel Tel Aviv was founded in 1923. Although initially reluctant to play each other, in early 1928 the clubs came to an operating agreement, and the first friendly encounter between the teams took place on 25 February 1928 on Maccabi ground, with Maccabi winning 3–0, With a rematch played a week later on Hapoel ground, this time Maccabi winning 2–1.

Between them, the clubs had together won 36 championships and 40 national cups. Both clubs have played in the top division of Israeli football both before and since independence in 1948, with the exception of the 1989–90 season, when Hapoel played in the second tier following relegation the previous season and with the exception of the 2017–18 season, when Hapoel played in the second tier following relegation the previous season. The first league encounter between the teams was played on 19 December 1931, and the points were shared with a result of 1–1. Prior to the independence, the clubs have met 17 times in the league, out of which Hapoel won 9, Maccabi won 5 and 3 resulted in a draw. Post 1948, Maccabi holds the lead with 60 league victories, opposite 46 Hapoel wins and 59 draws. Overall, since 1931, Hapoel has 55 league victories, Maccabi has 65 and 62 matches ended with a draw.

The two clubs met 8 times at the Israeli State Cup final, most recently at the 2020–21 Israel State Cup Final. The clubs also met in several other competitive tournaments, such as the Toto Cup and the Israel Super Cup.

The rivalry between the traditional background of the Hapoel and Maccabi sports associations led to the development of the rivalry between the clubs. The two clubs have different support bases; Hapoel are linked to the working-class, whilst Maccabi are considered a more middle class club.

A 3 November 2014 match was cancelled after numerous fans ran onto the pitch and began fighting with players and other fans. Hapoel manager called it a "black day" for Israeli football.

Bloomfield Stadium

Both clubs currently play at the Bloomfield Stadium. When Hapoel Tel Aviv are the home team in the derby gates 10–11, are reserved for fans of Maccabi. When Maccabi Tel Aviv are the home team, gates 4–5 are reserved for fans of Hapoel.

Tel Aviv mini-derby
Other matches between top-tier teams from Tel Aviv, currently Bnei Yehuda Tel Aviv, and in the past also Beitar Tel Aviv, Shimson Tel Aviv and Maccabi Jaffa, and between those other teams and either Maccabi or Hapoel are usually referred to as the Tel Aviv mini-derby or the Little Tel Aviv Derby.

List of results

Israel State Cup

Toto Cup

Other competitions

Gallery

References

 
 

Football derbies in Israel
Maccabi Tel Aviv F.C.
Hapoel Tel Aviv F.C.
Bnei Yehuda Tel Aviv F.C.
Beitar Tel Aviv F.C.
Shimshon Tel Aviv F.C.
Maccabi Jaffa F.C.

Football in Israel